Hoçaz is a village in the Lachin District of Azerbaijan.

History 
The village was located in the Armenian-occupied territories surrounding Nagorno-Karabakh, coming under the control of ethnic Armenian forces during the First Nagorno-Karabakh War in the early 1990s. The village subsequently became part of the breakaway Republic of Artsakh as part of its Kashatagh Province, where it was known as Hochants. It was returned to Azerbaijan as part of the 2020 Nagorno-Karabakh ceasefire agreement.

Historical heritage sites 
Historical heritage sites in and around the village include a cave, a 14th-century cemetery, eight 14th-century khachkars, the church of Hochantsi Anapat from 1621, a 16th/17th-century khachkar, a 17th-century tombstone, a 17th-century stele, and the 17th-century St. Stephen's Church, which was reconsecrated in 2019.

References

External links 
 

Villages in Azerbaijan
Populated places in Lachin District